Pakistan’s tradition of poetry includes Urdu poetry, English poetry, Sindhi poetry, Pashto poetry, Punjabi poetry, Saraiki poetry, Baluchi poetry, and Kashmiri poetry. Sufi poetry has a strong tradition in Pakistan and the poetry of popular Sufi poets is often recited and sung.

Urdu poets

Feminist poets

Comical poets

English poets

Punjabi poets

Saraiki poets

Sindhi poets

Pashto poets

Balochi poetry

See also
 List of Pakistani writers

References

 
Poetry by country
Poetry